Alfredo Layne (October 9, 1959 – June 25, 1999) was a Panamanian professional boxer. Layne is notable for having won the WBA and lineal super featherweight titles.

Professional boxing career
Layne, who began fighting professionally in 1981, fought in his first world title fight on May 24, 1986, as he travelled to San Juan to challenge the Puerto Rican world champion Wilfredo Gómez. Layne won the fight with a ninth round technical knockout to become the new WBA and Lineal champion. Layne's title reign was ended later in the year when he was beaten by Brian Mitchell in the first defence of his belt. Layne lost six out of his next seven fights, including a loss to Rafael Williams in December 1988, his final professional contest.
Layne was shot dead in June 1999, aged 39.

Professional boxing record

See also
List of super featherweight boxing champions
List of WBA world champions

References

External links
 
Alfredo Layne - CBZ Profile

1959 births
1999 deaths
Deaths by firearm in Panama
Male murder victims
Panamanian male boxers
Super-featherweight boxers
World Boxing Association champions
People murdered in Panama
20th-century Panamanian people